Aoraia insularis, also known as the Rakiura ghost moth, is a species of moth of the family Hepialidae. It is endemic to New Zealand and is found on only on Stewart Island and Steward Island's surrounding smaller islands. It was described by John S. Dugdale in 1994.

The wingspan is 54–65 mm for males. The forewing pattern is intricate, in tan and yellow-brown on a darker brown ground colour. The hindwings are yellowish fawn or sometimes smoky brown. Adults are on wing from January to March.

Larvae have been collected from shafts associated with tussocks on Poa foliosa.

References

External links

Citizen science observations

Moths described in 1994
Hepialidae
Moths of New Zealand
Endemic fauna of New Zealand
Endemic moths of New Zealand